Daniel French may refer to:

Daniel French (inventor) (1770–1853), American inventor and steamboat pioneer
Daniel Chester French (1850–1931), American sculptor
Daniel French (footballer) (born 1979), English footballer